{{DISPLAYTITLE:A∞-operad}}
In the theory of operads in algebra and algebraic topology, an A∞-operad is a parameter space for a multiplication map that is homotopy coherently associative. (An operad that describes a multiplication that is both homotopy coherently associative and homotopy coherently commutative is called an E∞-operad.)

Definition 
In the (usual) setting of operads with an action of the symmetric group on topological spaces, an operad A is said to be an A∞-operad if all of its spaces A(n) are Σn-equivariantly homotopy equivalent to the discrete spaces Σn (the symmetric group) with its multiplication action (where n ∈ N). In the setting of non-Σ operads (also termed nonsymmetric operads, operads without permutation), an operad A is A∞if all of its spaces A(n) are contractible.  In other categories than topological spaces, the notions of homotopy and contractibility have to be replaced by suitable analogs, such as homology equivalences in the category of chain complexes.

An-operads 
The letter A in the terminology stands for "associative", and the infinity symbols says that associativity is required up to "all" higher homotopies. More generally, there is a weaker notion of An-operad (n ∈ N), parametrizing multiplications that are associative only up to a certain level of homotopies. In particular,

 A1-spaces are pointed spaces;
 A2-spaces are H-spaces with no associativity conditions; and
 A3-spaces are homotopy associative H-spaces.

A∞-operads and single loop spaces 
A space X is the loop space of some other space, denoted by BX, if and only if X is an algebra over an -operad and the monoid π0(X) of its connected components is a group. An algebra over an -operad is referred to as an -space. There are three consequences of this characterization of loop spaces. First, a loop space is an -space. Second, a connected -space X is a loop space. Third, the group completion of a possibly disconnected -space is a loop space.

The importance of -operads in homotopy theory stems from this relationship between algebras over -operads and loop spaces.

A∞-algebras
An algebra over the -operad is called an -algebra. Examples feature the Fukaya category of a symplectic manifold, when it can be defined (see also pseudoholomorphic curve).

Examples 
This operad describes strictly associative multiplications. By definition, any other -operad has a map to a which is a homotopy equivalence.

A geometric example of an A∞-operad is given by the Stasheff polytopes or associahedra.

A less combinatorial example is the operad of little intervals: The space  consists of all embeddings of n disjoint intervals into the unit interval.

See also 
 Homotopy associative algebra
 operad
 E-infinity operad
 loop space

References 
 

Abstract algebra
Algebraic topology